"The Perfect Kiss" is a song by the English alternative dance and rock band New Order. It was recorded at Britannia Row Studios in London and released on 13 May 1985. It is the first New Order song to be included on a studio album, Low-Life, at the same time as its release as a single. The vinyl version has Factory catalogue number FAC 123 and the video has the opposite number, FAC 321.

Background
The song reached number 46 in the UK charts.

The song's themes include love ("We believe in a land of love") and death ("the perfect kiss is the kiss of death"). The overall meaning of the song is unclear to its writer today. In an interview with GQ magazine Bernard Sumner said "I haven't a clue what this is about." He agreed with the interviewer that his best known lyric is in the song: "Pretending not to see his gun / I said, 'Let's go out and have some fun'". The lyrics, he added, came about after the band was visiting a man's house in the United States who showed his guns under his bed before they went out for an enjoyable night. It had been quickly written, recorded and mixed without sleep before the band went on tour in Australia.

The song's complex arrangement includes a number of instruments and methods not normally used by New Order. For example, a bridge features frogs croaking melodically. The band reportedly included them because Morris loved the effect and was looking for any excuse to use it. At the end of the track, the faint bleating of a (synthesized) sheep can be heard. Sheep samples would reappear in later New Order singles "Fine Time" and "Ruined in a Day".

The song was not performed live between 1993 and 2006 due to the complexity of converting the programs from the E-mu Emulator to the new Roland synthesizer. However, it returned to the live set at a performance in Athens on 3 June 2006.

Sleeve
The Peter Saville sleeve is uniform silver with the word "perfect" embossed on the front side and "kiss The" on the back, like a wraparound band. It was about this time that the photographer Geoff Power [see "Shellshock"] was introduced to Saville. So enamoured was Saville by Power's work that he originally offered the photographer the cover to Low-Life. Then when that fell through, they worked on a cover for "The Perfect Kiss" using one of Power's Grimsby dock's photographs, which can be seen later in New Order's songbook, 'X'. With time running out and Saville's decision not to run with this image – it didn't fit in with his subsequent portraits of the band on Low-Life and also being a colour photograph clashed with the monochrome of the album cover.  A year later Power offered the use of a similar image for the New Order release, Shellshock.

Versions
Lasting nearly 9 minutes, the full 12" single version of the song is longer than even "Blue Monday", New Order's 1983 dance epic. This version also appears on the vinyl edition of Substance, with the CD pressings deleting 44 seconds of the climactic finale, due to time limitations of the CD format in 1987 (future reissues of Substance did not restore the missing 44 seconds, even though newer CDs would allow for it). The full version was eventually released unedited on the 2-disc deluxe edition of Low-Life, marking its first appearance on CD.

The version on the original Low-Life and all post-Substance compilations is a 4:48 edit that omits the third verse (the one that mentions the song's title), replaces the original intro with that of the song's B-side, "Kiss of Death", and fades out before the climax. This version is present on the A-side of the 7" single from the Philippines; most 7" issues from other countries have on the A-side a version that is further edited to 4:24 (in some or all cases without the percussion introduction). The UK 7" promo release on Factory Records is a rarely heard edit cut by Ivan Ivan which compresses most of the elements of the full, 8:46 version (including the ending but not the third verse) into 3:50.

There is also a pre-edited recording of the live performance filmed for the music video with later overdubbed mistakes left intact; it is available on the bonus disc included with some editions of Retro and on various promotional vinyl releases.

The song has been remixed by third parties like Razormaid and Hot Tracks and has been covered by bands including Capsule Giants, Nude,
International,
Paradoxx, Razed in a New Division of Agony,
and Amoeba Crunch.

B-sides
"The Kiss of Death" is a typical New Order dub version: it is a mostly instrumental remix of the A-side with added effects; it notably features the opening of the album version. "Perfect Pit" is a short recording of synthesized bass and drum parts that sounds like Gillian Gilbert and Stephen Morris practicing.

Music video
Jonathan Demme directed the song's video, which depicts the band playing the song from beginning to end in their practice room. According to Factory Records owner Tony Wilson, Demme was looking forward to filming dynamic shots of Stephen Morris behind the drum kit and was dismayed to find that the drums in the song were all programmed.

The 11 minute video features a Joy Division poster for Unknown Pleasures that can be prominently seen behind Bernard Sumner.

The video appeared on the Substance 1989 VHS tape and the DVD A Collection. An edit of the video version appeared on a US 12" single in 1985. The full audio take, including Demme's remarks before and after the performance, appeared on a bonus CD included with early copies of the box set Retro. Since it is a unique live performance, the video version of the song sounds different from other released versions.

Credits
Director - Jonathan Demme
Producer - Michael Shamberg
Cinematography - Henri Alekan
Editor - Tony Lawson
Studio - Factory Films
Distributor - Palace Pictures

Track listing

Chart positions

References

External links

1984 songs
1985 singles
New Order (band) songs
Songs written by Bernard Sumner
Songs written by Peter Hook
Songs written by Stephen Morris (musician)
Songs written by Gillian Gilbert
Factory Records singles
UK Independent Singles Chart number-one singles
Songs about kissing